Whitney Osuigwe was the defending champion, having won the last edition in 2019 but retired in the first round against Arianne Hartono.

Claire Liu won the title after Wang Xinyu retired in the final at 3–6, 6–4, 4–1.

Seeds

Draw

Finals

Top half

Bottom half

References

Main Draw

Boar's Head Resort Women's Open - Singles